The Swist is a stream,  long, in the German Rhineland. Occasionally the Swist is also called the Swistbach, and locals often just call it der Bach ("the stream").
 
The Swist flows through the municipality Swisttal, the town of Meckenheim and Flerzheim. There are cycle paths by the side of the stream along this stretch. The Swist gave its name to Swisttal and the town of Weilerswist. Its source area is situated at the northern edge of the Eifel.

Geography

Course 
The Swist has an average gradient of 5 ‰ and flows initially to Vettelhoven (Grafschaft) in a northeasterly direction and then descends at a gradient of just 1.3 ‰ through the Fore-Eifel. At  the Swist empties into the Erft between Weilerswist and Bliesheim.

Catchment 
It is rural and, in the open country, arable fields predominate. Around the upper courses of the stream and its especially along its important left-hand tributaries there is a large contiguous forest as well as pastures and meadows. The largest part of the catchment belongs to the state of North Rhine-Westphalia, the source region is in Rhineland-Palatinate.

Tributaries 
The most important tributary of the Swist is the Steinbach, which joins from the left at river kilometre 15.7 as the Jungbach. Between  and Essig it bears the name Orbach. The tributaries of the Swist are listed below.

River history 
Originally the River Ahr flowed in what is now the riverbed of the Swist. After the uplifting of the Ahr Hills, and its route northwards was barred, the Ahr tried to find a way directly to the Rhine.

In places it is said that the Swist is the longest stream (i.e. German Bach, small river) in Europe This probably goes back to when its course was marked by wide meanders in the area of the low gradient between Vettelhoven and its mouth. Since the straightening of the Swist in the early 20th century and certainly no later than its canalisation in the 1960s it has probably lost this record.

Historic bridges 

The Roman aqueduct to Cologne crossed the valley of the Swist between Meckenheim and Rheinbach on an arched bridge which was 1,400 metres long and up to 10 metres high. Nothing is left of the structure apart from a low strip of rubble. In Lützermiel the foundations of a Prussian bridge have survived. The bridge once carried the district road (Bezirksstraße) from Bonn to Schleiden, built in 1823, over the Swist.

See also 
List of rivers of North Rhine-Westphalia
List of rivers of Rhineland-Palatinate

References

External links 

 
 

Rivers of North Rhine-Westphalia
Rivers of Rhineland-Palatinate
Rivers of the Eifel
Rivers of Germany